Sam Tan Chin Siong (born ) is a Singaporean former politician. A member of the governing People's Action Party, he was the Member of Parliament (MP) representing the Radin Mas division of Tanjong Pagar GRC between 2006 and 2011 and Radin Mas SMC between 2011 and 2020. 

Tan had served as Minister of State for Culture, Community and Youth between 2014 and 2015, Minister of State in the Prime Minister's Office between 2014 and 2018, Minister of State for Manpower between 2015 and 2018, Minister of State for Foreign Affairs between 2017 and 2020 and Minister of State for Social and Family Development between 2018 and 2020. He had also served as Mayor of Central Singapore District between 2011 and 2014.

Early life and education
Tan attended Tuan Mong High School and Hwa Chong Junior College before graduating from the National University of Singapore in 1983 with a Bachelor of Arts with honours degree.

Tan started his career at the People's Association (PA), where he served as Deputy Executive Director between 1992 and 1997. He subsequently became Executive Director of the Chinese Development Assistance Council (CDAC) in 1997. From 2007 to 2009, he served as the chief executive officer of Business China.

Political career
Tan made his political debut in the 2006 general election contesting in Tanjong Pagar GRC and won by an uncontested walkover.

Tan was appointed Parliamentary Secretary for Trade and Industry, and Parliamentary Secretary for Information, Communications and the Arts concurrently from July 2009 to October 2009. He was subsequently promoted to Senior Parliamentary Secretary in November 2009, and served until May 2011.

During the 2011 general election, Tan contested in the newly-created Radin Mas SMC. Tan faced a challenge from veteran Yip Yew Weng of the National Solidarity Party after two other political parties, Reform Party and Singapore Democratic Alliance withdrew in favour of the NSP. Tan won by a large margin, garnering 67.10% of the vote.

Tan was appointed Senior Parliamentary Secretary for Foreign Affairs, and Senior Parliamentary Secretary for Community Development, Youth and Sports in May 2011. He was also appointed Mayor of Central Singapore District.

On 28 September 2015, it was announced that Tan will become Minister of State for Manpower from 1 October 2015.

On 29 June 2020, Tan announced that he will not contest in the 2020 general election.

Awards
 PBM (Pingat Bakti Masyarakat) Public Service Medal (2002)

References

 Parliament of Singapore - CV of Mr Sam Tan Chin Siong 

Singaporean people of Hokkien descent
Living people
People's Action Party politicians
1958 births
Members of the Parliament of Singapore